Bathochordaeus stygius is a species of larvacean in the family Oikopleuridae.

References 

Animals described in 1937
Appendicularia